Amartya Talukdar is a blogger and a men's rights activist. He holds a Masters in Mechanical Engineering from The Institute of Technology, Banaras Hindu University.

Blogging
He won The Times of India award for the most engaging blog at The Apeejay Kolkata Literature Festival. A men's rights activist, his blog advocates altering "lopsided" laws on alimony, dowry and marriage.

Activism
He is the founder member of HRIDAYA, a Men's Right Organization that has spearheaded men's rights movement in West Bengal, a province in India.

HRIDAYA-a nest of family harmony operates under the umbrella of Save Indian Family. It lobbies against gender-biased laws that affect men. HRIDAYA has also called for setting up of a separate ministry for Men's welfare. The NGO also provides help and support to distressed men and their families. It runs a workshop called Hope for Men to coach distressed men to cope with their lives.

Talukdar has organised many street protests against gender-biased laws. He has spoken on men's rights at various places, including the Commerce Fest of St. Xavier's College, Kolkata and TEDxBESC.

Books

References

Living people
Men's rights activists
Indian bloggers
Year of birth missing (living people)
Place of birth missing (living people)
Nationality missing